The Albanian Supercup is a single match usually at the beginning of the season between the winners of the Kategoria Superiore and Albanian Cup.

Supercup final was not played in the occasions when the champion team won the Double. However, after year 2000 AFA rules changed and the final would still be played against the Cup runner-ups.

There have been 29 finals played in total. KF Tirana are the most successful team to have won the trophy 12 times.

Results of the finals

Performances

Performance by club

Records
Most wins: 12
Tirana (1994, 2000, 2002, 2003, 2005, 2006, 2007, 2009, 2011, 2012, 2017, 2022)

Most finals: 16
Tirana (1989, 1994, 2000, 2001, 2002, 2003, 2004, 2005, 2006, 2007, 2009, 2011, 2012, 2017, 2020, 2022)

Most consecutive wins: 3
Tirana (2005, 2006, 2007)

Most consecutive appearances: 8
Tirana (2000, 2001, 2002, 2003, 2004, 2005, 2006, 2007)

Biggest win:
Tirana 6–0 Dinamo Tirana (2002)

References

 
Albania
2
Recurring sporting events established in 1989